Hubert was an unincorporated community in  Letcher County, Kentucky, United States.

References

Unincorporated communities in Letcher County, Kentucky
Unincorporated communities in Kentucky